A fake moustache or false moustache is an item of prosthetic make-up used in dressing-up, acting, espionage and crime. Fake moustaches are made in different ways, but usually require the wearer to use adhesive to affix the moustache to their face. Some have a self-adhesive backing. National fake moustache day in the United States is on 24 February, while the international celebration is on 3 February. Mr. Pontipine, from In The Night Garden, has a fake moustache.

Notable false moustaches 

The most notable fake moustache of all-time was probably worn by Charlie Chaplin for his role as The Tramp. He initially wore a fake toothbrush moustache as a means of disguising his youth for the role.

Groucho Marx also used a fake moustache during his years in vaudeville and in the early Marx Brothers movies. His was drawn onto his lip with grease paint, containing no hairs or bristles. In later life he grew his own, real moustache. It, along with his cigar and waggling eyebrows, was his famous trademark.

In Dayton, Ohio, there is a group who gathers to celebrate the joy of the fake moustache. The Gem City Fake Mustache Society meets monthly for various events, some events include 5K races, Dayton Bombers games or local parades.

Kansas City has been said to have the premiere fake moustache club in North America. The Kansas City Fake Mustache Club has over 500 members throughout the world, including KCFMC Chapters in Chicago, Salt Lake City, and Pittsburg, Kansas.

References

Costume design
Artificial objects